Donald Barrows Partridge (June 7, 1891 – June 5, 1946) was an American politician from the U.S. state of Maine. Partridge was a lawyer, jurist, and Republican Party leader before he was elected to the U.S. House of Representatives, where he served a single term in the 1930s.

Biography
Partridge was born in Norway, Maine, a town in Oxford County. There he attended the common and high schools, and in 1914 he graduated from Bates College in Lewiston. After graduating he became the principal of the high school in Canton, and held this position until 1918. The following year, he was elected clerk of the supreme judicial court for Oxford County, and served from 1919 to 1931.

He studied law and was admitted to the bar in 1924 and began practicing in his hometown. He served as town clerk from 1924 to 1931 and member of Norway's board of education from 1926 to 1931. He was chairman of the Oxford County Republican committee for six years before elected as a Republican to the 72nd Congress, where he served a single two-year term (March 4, 1931–March 3, 1933). He was not a candidate for renomination in 1932, and returned to the practice of law in Norway after his term ended. In 1934, he was an unsuccessful candidate for the Republican nomination for Governor of Maine. In his later years he was a member of the Maine Industrial Accident Commission.

Partridge died in Portland while on a business trip. He is interred at Norway Pine Grove Cemetery in South Paris, Maine.

References

Donald B. Partridge at Political Graveyard

1891 births
1946 deaths
Bates College alumni
People from Norway, Maine
American jurists
Maine lawyers
Republican Party members of the United States House of Representatives from Maine
20th-century American politicians
20th-century American lawyers